A userscript manager is a type of browser extension and augmented browsing technology that provides a user interface to manage userscripts. The main purpose of a userscript manager is to execute scripts on webpages as they are loaded. The most common operations performed by a userscript manager include creating, installing, organizing, deleting and editing scripts, as well as modifying script permissions (e.g. website exceptions).

Userscript managers use metadata that is embedded in a script's source code primarily to determine the websites it should execute on and the dependencies necessary for the script to run properly. Metadata can also include information that is useful to the user such as the script's name, author, description and version number.

Functions 
A userscript is a computer program (written in JavaScript) containing metadata intended for use by a userscript manager. The metadata contains specific delimiters which help the userscript manager distinguish it from ordinary JavaScript files, along with configuration parameters used during installation.

Typical functions of a userscript manager include:
 Downloading dependencies (e.g. third party libraries, images)
 Providing automatic updates
 Creating and editing scripts

See also
Greasemonkey
Tampermonkey
List of augmented browsing software

External links
Violentmonkey
FireMonkey – combined userscript & userstyle manager add-on to Firefox
GreaseKit
Creammonkey

JavaScript
Software add-ons
Web software